Kohler Glacier is a distributary of the Smith Glacier in Marie Byrd Land, Antarctica, flowing northward through the middle of the Kohler Range into Dotson Ice Shelf. It was mapped by the U.S. Geological Survey from surveys and U.S. Navy air photos, 1959–65, and was named by the Advisory Committee on Antarctic Names in association with the Kohler Range.

See also
 List of glaciers in the Antarctic
 Barter Bluff

References

Glaciers of Marie Byrd Land